Provan may refer to:

Andy Provan, Scottish footballer
Charles D. Provan, American revisionist scholar and Christian theologian
Chris Provan, Born 1978 served 1st Bn Scots Guards 1996-2004
David Provan (disambiguation)
David Provan (footballer, born 1941) (1941–2016), Scottish footballer who played with Rangers and Scotland
David Provan (footballer, born 1956) (born 1956), Scottish footballer who played with Celtic and Scotland
Jaimee Provan, New Zealand field hockey olympian
James Provan, British politician
Norm Provan, Australian rugby league footballer and coach (brother of Peter)
Peter Provan, Australian rugby league footballer (brother of Norm)
Robert Provan, polio survivor and lawyer
Susan Provan, Australian performing arts producer, director of the Melbourne International Comedy Festival
Provan Gas Works, Scottish industrial gas holding plant